Eubranchus adarensis is a species of sea slug or nudibranch, a marine gastropod mollusc in the family Eubranchidae. Members of the species are hermaphrodites. The species deposits their eggs on a substratum, where they eventually hatch into a larval stage, ultimately reaching adulthood.

Distribution
This species was described from Cape Adare at the mouth of Robertson Bay, Antarctica in 82–92 m of water.

References

Eubranchidae
Gastropods described in 1934